Drew Mehringer (born December 10, 1987) is an American football coach and former player.

Coaching career

After the 2006 NCAA football season, Mehringer switched from a quarterback to a student assistant role at Rice. He earned his degree and left Rice to become a graduate assistant at Iowa State. He moved to Ohio State to serve in the same role in 2012.

He left the FBS in 2014, becoming the offensive coordinator at James Madison.

Prior to taking the job at Texas, Mehringer was the offensive coordinator and quarterback coach at Rutgers University and wide receivers coach at University of Houston.

On December 12, 2016, Mehringer officially joined the staff at the University of Texas as wide receiver coach and passing game coordinator.

On December 1, 2019, Mehringer was let go from his position with Texas and was soon hired by Florida Atlantic to be their co-offensive coordinator and wide receivers coach. After initially being shifted to the tight ends coach, Mehringer left Florida Atlantic to accept the quarterbacks coach position at New Mexico.

On December 30, 2021, it was reported that new Oregon head coach Dan Lanning was seeking to add Mehringer to his inaugural staff, and then a few hours later, it was reported that he would indeed be joining the Oregon staff.

Personal life
A native of Mansfield, Texas, Mehringer attended Rice as a quarterback before suffering a career-ending injury. He then served as a student assistant with the quarterbacks under Herman for three seasons (at both Rice and Iowa State), graduating from Rice in 2010 with a degree in political science. Mehringer earned a master's degree in sports management at Ohio State in 2013.

References

External links
 Florida Atlantic profile
 Iowa State profile

1987 births
Living people
American football quarterbacks
Florida Atlantic Owls football coaches
Houston Cougars football coaches
Iowa State Cyclones football coaches
James Madison Dukes football coaches
Ohio State Buckeyes football coaches
Oregon Ducks football coaches
Rice Owls football coaches
Rice Owls football players
Rutgers Scarlet Knights football coaches
Texas Longhorns football coaches
Ohio State University College of Education and Human Ecology alumni
Sportspeople from Arlington, Texas
People from Mansfield, Texas
Coaches of American football from Texas
Players of American football from Texas